Chestnut-backed bush warbler has been split into 3 species:

 Sulawesi bush warbler, Locustella castanea
 Seram bush warbler, Picus musculus
 Buru bush warbler, Picus disturbans

Birds by common name